Bato-Zhargal Zhambalnimbuyev (born 5 August 1948), is a Russian politician. He served as Auditor of the Accounts Chamber of Russia from 2013 to 2018.

He was previously a member of the Federation Council, a representative of the executive body of state power of Zabaykalsky Krai from 2010 to 2013. He also served as the representative of the legislative authority of Agin-Buryat Autonomous Okrug from 2001 to 2010.

Early life

Bato-Zhargal Zhambalnimbuyev was born on 5 August 1948 in Aginskoye, Agin-Buryat Autonomous Okrug.

In 1966, he worked at the Oryol GOK as an electrician. In 1973, he graduated from the S. M. Kirov Tomsk Polytechnic Institute, where he worked until 1981. At the institute he was first an assistant, then a senior lecturer. From 1981 to 1991 he worked at the Chita Polytechnic Institute, where he was a senior teacher, associate professor, and later head of department.

Zhambalnimbuyev has a PhD in technical sciences and held the title of associate professor.

Career 
On 14 March 2001, Zhambalnimbuyev became a Senator in the Federation Council, representing the legislative authority of Agin-Buryat Autonomous Okrug in the interests of the Agin-Buryat Autonomous Okrug Duma.

In 2004 he became a member of the Federation Council delegation to the NATO Parliamentary Assembly.

On 23 November 2005, Zhambalnimbuyev's powers in the Federation Council were reaffirmed. Council roles: 

 Federation Council Committee on Economic Policy 
 International Affairs Committee
 Commission for Monitoring the Operations of the Federation Council 
 Commission on Natural Monopolies
 Chairman of the Subcommittee on the Development of the Oil and Gas Industry, Pipeline Transport and Terminals
 Committee on Natural Resources and Environmental Protection
 Deputy Chairman of the Federation Council Commission for Control over the Activities of the Federation Council
 Federation Council Committee on Budget and Financial Markets.

On 15 December 2010, Zhambalnimbuyev's powers were confirmed for the third time, as a Member of the Federation Council serving as representative from the executive authority of Zabaykalsky Krai.

At the 112th Assembly of the Inter-Parliamentary Union in Manila, Philippines, he was elected Vice-President of the Standing Committee on Peace and Security. At the 124th Assembly in Panama, he was elected Vice-President of the Standing Committee on Sustainable Development, Finance and Trade.

On 25 September 2013, at the proposal of Vladimir Putin, Zhambalnimbuyev was appointed by the Federation Council as an auditor of the Accounts Chamber of Russia. He was a member of the Government Commission on the agro-industrial complex and sustainable development of rural areas, a member of the Commission of the Government of Russia on the development of the fishery complex, and a member of the Council for forestry development. 

On 23 November 2018, the Federation Council dismissed Zhambalnimbuyev from the position of auditor.

References

1948 births
Living people
Buryat politicians
Members of the Federation Council of Russia (after 2000)
People from Aginsky District
Tomsk Polytechnic University alumni
Academic staff of Tomsk Polytechnic University